The Bill Cosby Show is an American sitcom television series, that aired for two seasons on NBC's Sunday night schedule from 1969 until 1971, under the sponsorship of Procter & Gamble. There were 52 episodes made in the series. It marked Bill Cosby's first solo foray in television, after his co-starring role with Robert Culp in I Spy.

The series also marked the first time an African American starred in their own eponymous comedy series.

Synopsis

Cosby played the role of Chet Kincaid, a physical education teacher at a Los Angeles high school, a bachelor, and an average cool guy trying to earn a living and help people out along the way. The show ran for two seasons, 52 episodes in all. While only a modest critical success, the series was nominated for two Primetime Emmys.

The Bill Cosby Show was a ratings hit, finishing eleventh in its first season. With the high school as the setting of most episodes, storylines involve life lessons, students and fellow teachers, family drama, a coach's purview, and a few challenging forays, such as a substitute teacher of algebra or English.

Cosby was lauded for using some infrequently seen classic African American performers, such as Lillian Randolph (as Kincaid's mother) and Rex Ingram. Well-known stars who rarely did television appeared as well, including Henry Fonda and veteran comedians Mantan Moreland and Moms Mabley as Kincaid's feuding uncle and aunt.

The show's brass-heavy, funky theme song, "Hikky Burr", was written by Cosby and Quincy Jones, with Cosby providing the vocals. A new version of the theme was recorded for the second season.

The show did not use a laugh track; in that regard it was unique among half-hour situation comedies at the time. Cosby and NBC were at odds over his refusal to include a laugh track in the show. Cosby felt that viewers were intelligent enough to find the humor themselves, without being prompted.

While a few comedy dramas already aired without laugh tracks, few sitcoms went without, and those that did had studio audiences. The handful of non-drama sitcoms without a laugh track or studio audience prior to this included The Trouble with Father and The Beulah Show.

Episodes

Season 1 (1969–70)

Season 2 (1970–71)

Syndication
In September 1984, Cosby returned to NBC, with a similarly named sitcom titled The Cosby Show. The popularity of that sitcom led to reruns of this one being picked up on the CBN Cable Network.

In 2013, reruns of this series began being broadcast on the ASPIRE Television Network and Soul of the South Network. In July 2015, both networks ceased airing the series following allegations of sexual assaults made against Cosby.

Home media
Shout! Factory has released both seasons of The Bill Cosby Show on DVD in Region 1.

Mill Creek Entertainment released a ten episode best of set entitled The Bill Cosby Show – The Best of Season 1 on March 22, 2011.

References

External links 
Official Bill Cosby Site
 
 

Bill Cosby
1960s American black sitcoms
1970s American black sitcoms
1960s American high school television series
1970s American high school television series
1960s American workplace comedy television series
1970s American workplace comedy television series
1969 American television series debuts
1971 American television series endings
English-language television shows
NBC original programming
Television series about educators
Television shows set in Los Angeles
Television series created by Bill Cosby
Television series created by Ed. Weinberger